The Monaco men's national tennis team represents Monaco in the Davis Cup tennis competition and are governed by the Fédération Monegasque de Lawn Tennis.

Monaco currently compete in World Group II. The team reached the top-8 in the European Zone in 1972, which is still their best result in the Davis Cup.

History
Monaco competed in its first Davis Cup in 1929.

Current team (2022)

 Valentin Vacherot
 Lucas Catarina
 Hugo Nys
 Romain Arneodo (Doubles player)

See also
Davis Cup

References

External links

Davis Cup teams
Davis Cup
Davis Cup